The 7th Emmy Awards, later referred to as the 7th Primetime Emmy Awards, were held on March 7, 1955, to honor the best in television of the year. The ceremony was held at the "Moulin Rouge Nightclub" in Hollywood, California.  The ceremony, hosted by Steve Allen and broadcast on NBC, was the first Emmy Awards ceremony to be televised nationally. All nominations are listed, with winners in bold and series' networks are in parentheses.
New categories for this ceremony included awards for writing and directing, as well as one-time performances in anthology series, (this category would eventually morph into the current guest-acting category). Studio One was the most successful show of the night, winning three awards.

Fredric March made Emmy history when he became the first actor to be nominated for two different works in the same category. However, he lost for both of his performances in the category of Best Actor in a Single Performance.

Winners and nominees
Winners are listed first, highlighted in boldface, and indicated with a double dagger (‡).

Programs

Acting

Lead performances

Supporting performances

Single performances

Directing

Writing

Hosting

Singing

Most major nominations
By network 
 CBS – 60
 NBC – 44
 ABC – 15

 By program
 I Love Lucy (CBS) / Studio One (CBS) / The Jackie Gleason Show (CBS) – 5
  Four Star Playhouse (CBS) / Make Room for Daddy (ABC) / Medic (NBC) / Your Show of Shows (NBC) – 4
  Climax! (CBS) / Dragnet (NBC) / The George Burns and Gracie Allen Show (CBS) / Lux Video Theatre (CBS) / Mr. Peepers (NBC) / Our Miss Brooks (CBS) / The Philco Television Playhouse (NBC) – 3

Most major awards
By network 
 CBS – 10
 NBC – 7
 ABC – 6

 By program
 Studio One (CBS) – 3
 Disneyland (ABC) / The Jackie Gleason Show (CBS) / Make Room for Daddy (ABC) – 2

Notes

References

External links
 Emmys.com list of 1955 Nominees & Winners
 

007
Primetime Emmy Awards
Primetime Emmy
Primetime Emmy Awards
Primetime Emmy Awards
Primetime Emmy Awards